AGBU Armenian Virtual College (AVC) is an accredited  online learning institution that facilitates Armenian Studies through new technologies.
Although based in Yerevan, Armenia, the College primarily serves the Armenian Diaspora, where opportunities for learning Armenian vary from community to community. AVC’s mission is to preserve the Armenian identity providing learners around the world the opportunity to receive a full-fledged Armenian education, regardless of their age, country of residence or level of knowledge. AVC also strives to create a virtual learning community that fosters both the cultural education and social communication otherwise out of the reach of students who wish to pursue education in the field of Armenian Studies. As of today AVC has served about 4,000 students from over 75 countries.  Students can choose to earn credits for each course that they complete, ultimately leading to a certificate. Also, students may transfer credit from AVC courses to various universities and learning institutes across the world.

History 
The idea of AVC was born and the project was initiated in 2004 by Armenian General Benevolent Union (AGBU) Silicon Valley Chapter in order to better address the needs of students who wished to learn Armenian language, history and culture, but were unable to do so due to lack of schools in their location; the project also meant to offer a program in Armenian studies through an innovative approach and new technologies to appeal to present-day students.  The inaugural academic term took place in 2009 with courses in Armenian language and Armenian history. Later, AVC multiplied the courses; Armenian culture and chess were added as subjects, and added more languages of instruction. As of today, the courses are available on multiple levels and in seven languages of instruction: Eastern Armenian, Western Armenian, English, French, Russian, Spanish and Turkish.

In 2013, a partnership was announced with the University of Granada whereby AVC provides Eastern Armenian language courses to University of Granada students as a third foreign language option.

In 2014, AVC redefined the Armenian experience by presenting a new multiplatform media product series-AVC Multimedia e-Book Series covering a wide variety of topics about Armenian history, culture and contemporary affairs. With the release of the Armenian Highland, the first in the series of interactive e-books, AVC’s expansion in a new direction was marked.

References

External links
 AVC Website
 AGBU Website

Armenian General Benevolent Union
Armenian schools